The Navarrese People's Union, abbreviated to UPN, is a regional conservative political party in Navarre, Spain. Until 2008, it was a fraternal party of the People's Party (PP), acting as the latter's Navarrese branch.

UPN is a strong opponent of Basque nationalism, and supports a Spanish regional identity for Navarre with a marginal Basque component and separate from the Basque Country. The party's regionalist tradition dates back to the nineteenth century, in which the Spanish nation is seen to be based on 'regional liberties'.

During the 1991–2008 period, UPN acted as the Navarrese branch of the PP, which, in return, did not run at Navarrese elections as a part of their agreement. During this period, UPN was the largest party in elections for the regional Parliament of Navarre and the ruling party of the Autonomous Community from 1996 to 2015.

History

The UPN was a Navarrese splinter group of the Union of the Democratic Centre. Its president, Miguel Sanz, had been the head of the Navarrese government from 1996 to 2015.

Juan Cruz Alli was elected president of the Navarrese government for UPN, but later disagreed with the orientation the party was taking and founded another party Democrats' Convergence of Navarre.

Pacts with the PP
As part of an agreement held over the 1991–2008 period, the PP did not run in any elections in the Navarra Congress Electoral District and People's Party of Navarre (founded in 1989) was dissolved, while UPN were on the same national ticket as the PP at the Spanish national elections. The national Deputies and Senators elected as part of UPN's ticket were part of the PP Parliamentary Group. Also, UPN members were eligible –and indeed chosen– for national leadership positions in the PP.

The pact was terminated in October 2008 as a result of UPN refusal to vote alongside the PP in the Spanish Congress of Deputies to reject the government budget presented by José Luis Rodríguez Zapatero's cabinet. One of the two MPs elected under the UPN-PP ticket refused to follow UPN's instructions and a number of UPN elected representatives defected this party to join the PP. The new situation led to the PP setting up its own office in Navarre.

The two parties ran separate lists in the 2011 regional elections in Navarre with the UPN receiving 34.5% against the 7.3% that the PP received. On 8 September 2011, the two parties reached an agreement to renew their alliance for the 2011 Spanish general election. Under the agreement, the UPN would take the first and third places on the list for Congress while the PP would have the second. For the Senate, the UPN would have the top two places on the list, with the PP taking the third place. A major factor in the new agreement was the two parties desire to prevent Bildu from winning enough seats to form a parliamentary group.

Electoral performance

Parliament of Navarre

Cortes Generales

Notes

References

External links
 Navarrese People's Union official site
 Parliament of Navarre

Conservative parties in Spain
Political parties in Navarre
Union of the Democratic Centre (Spain)
Political parties established in 1979
1979 establishments in Spain
Catholic political parties